In the sport of Australian rules football, each of the eighteen players in a team is assigned to a particular named position on the field of play. These positions describe both the player's main role and by implication their location on the ground. As the game has evolved, tactics and team formations have changed, and the names of the positions and the duties involved have evolved too. There are 18 positions in Australian rules football, not including four (sometimes 6–8) interchange players who may replace another player on the ground at any time during play.

The fluid nature of the modern game means the positions in football are not as formally defined as in sports such as rugby or American football. Even so, most players will play in a limited range of positions throughout their career, as each position requires a particular set of skills. Footballers who are able to play comfortably in numerous positions are referred to as utility players.

Back line
The term back line can either refer to the full-back line consisting of the two back pockets and the full-back, or both the full- and half-back lines, which collectively can also be referred to as the defence, defensive unit or the back six.

Full-back 
The full-back position has always been a purely defensive role, with the aim of stopping the full-forward from getting the ball and scoring. But, in recent times, where the ability to move the ball out of the back and down the field quickly has become a more important tactic, the full-back often starts a chain of passes up the ground. The defensive aspect of the position remains important, with the ability to accelerate and change direction quickly. Spoiling the ball is also of utmost importance. The full-back often kicks the ball back into play after a point has been scored, although some teams prefer a midfielder or the small back pockets for this role, freeing the (typically taller) fullback player to attempt to mark the kick in.

Notable full-backs:

 George 'Jocka' Todd
 Jack Regan
 Vic Thorp
 Fred Baring
 Fred Hughson
 Stephen Silvagni
 Chris Langford
 Geoff Southby
 David Dench
 Kelvin Moore
 Gary Malarkey
 Rod Carter
 Gary Pert
 Michael Brennan
 Ashley McIntosh
 Darren Gaspar
 Ben Rutten 
 Simon Prestigiacomo
 Darren Glass
 Brian Lake
 Matthew Scarlett
 Dustin Fletcher
 Mal Michael
 Mick Martyn
 Shane Wakelin
 Tom Jonas
 Alex Rance
 Harris Andrews
 Tom Lonergan
 Zac Dawson

Back pocket 
The back pocket refers to a position on the field deep in defence.

Back pocket players need to have good spoiling skills and usually, quality back-pockets are noted for their hardness. Back pockets generally play on the smaller, faster forward pockets and let the fullback play on the stronger full forward.

Some back-pockets are small, fast players, whose role is to clear a loose ball from defence or play on a forward of similar size and speed. Others are 'mid-sized' defenders, with enough height and strength to contest or spoil marks and enough mobility to fulfil the first role.

Back pocket is not an exclusive position. Tall defenders (i.e. full back/centre half-back) may play in the back pocket to match up effectively on a tall forward playing in the forward pocket.

Numerous back pocket players have gone on to coach successfully, including Kevin Sheedy, Mick Malthouse, Tom Hafey, Denis Pagan and David Parkin.

Notable back pocket players:

 Wally Donald
 Bernie Smith
 Brad Hardie
 Gary Ayres
 Charlie Sutton
 Ian Nankervis
 John Rantall
 Laurie Fowler
 Mark Browning
 Jeff Dunne
 Andrew Collins
 Glenn Archer
 James Clement
 Shane Parker
 David Wirrpanda
 Michael Green
 Chris Johnson
 Ang Christou
 Gavin Wanganeen
 Darren Milburn
 Campbell Brown
 Ben Hart
 Daniel Edwards
 Dale Morris

Half-back line

The half-back line consists of two half-back flankers and the centre half-back. The role of centre half-back has remained largely unmodified throughout the years. The centre half-back dominates play to a significant extent, and hence is considered a key position in defence.

Ideally, the centre half-back should be a durable player, quite tall and well-built. Along with their half-back flankers, centre half-backs are the first line of defence, but also key players in winning the ball, and creating and assisting in attack.

Centre half-backs must have a great understanding of team structures, especially the strategies for kick-ins. They need to be able to compete and take contested marks, and also run off their opponent to win uncontested possessions and force their opponents to chase.

Notable centre half-backs:

 Albert Collier
 Tom Fitzmaurice
 Wally Buttsworth
 Gordon Strang
 Bert Deacon
 Neil Roberts
 Col Austen
 Gary Hardeman
 Peter Knights
 Billy Picken
 Ross Glendinning
 Paul Roos
 Chris Mew
 Chris Grant
 Michael Sexton
 Glen Jakovich
 Sean Wellman
 Justin Leppitsch
 Trent Croad
 Josh Gibson
 Luke McPharlin
 James Gwilt

The half-back flank is very similar to the back pocket position. However, a true half-back flanker is more attacking and concentrates on rebounding the ball out of the defensive 50. Sometimes half-back flankers even forgo their defensive duties in order to be more attacking. When a half-back flanker is attacking, they play like a wing-back in soccer (or an attacking full-back), and if they are more defensive then they play like a traditional full-back in soccer.

Notable half-back flankers:

 Kevin Murray
 Bruce Doull
 Luke Hodge
 Andrew McLeod
 Trevor Barker
 Ken Fletcher
 Wayne Schimmelbusch
 Guy McKenna
 John Worsfold
 Nigel Smart
 Mark Bayes
 Mervyn Keane
 David O'Halloran
 Ken Hinkley
 Brett Lovett
 David Grant
 Dean Laidley
 Mark Bickley
 Grant Birchall
 Brett Deledio
 Shannon Hurn
 Paul Seedsman

Half-forward line

Centre half-forward
The centre half-forward's role is usually the most demanding of any player on field, with a tall frame, good marking skills, strength and most importantly, athleticism, required.

A centre half-forward who is strongly built and specialises in charging packs is often categorised as a power forward.

Notable centre half-forwards:

 Wayne Carey
 Royce Hart
 Albert Thurgood
 Barrie Robran
 Bernie Quinlan
 Ted Whitten
 Darrel Baldock
 Dermott Brereton
 Stephen Kernahan
 Garry Lyon
 Terry Daniher
 Ivor Warne-Smith
 Laurie Nash
 Ken Hands
 Fred Flanagan
 Horrie Clover
 Ken Fraser
 Nick Riewoldt
 Matthew Pavlich
 Warren Tredrea
 Graham Cornes
 Kelvin Templeton
 Jonathan Brown
 Matthew Richardson
 Jarryd Roughead
 Travis Cloke
 Lance Franklin
 Taylor Walker

Half-forward flank 
Standing wide of the centre half-forward, the half-forward flankers provide an alternate target for balls coming from the midfield.

Half-forward flankers usually move the ball into the forward line along the flanks. They might kick the ball into the forward line, pass the ball to another running player, or have a shot at goal themselves. These days half-forward flankers usually push into the midfield and, rather than being a specialist position, half-forward flank can be played by centres, wingers, rovers/ruck-rovers, or even attacking half-back flankers.

Notable half-forward flankers:

 Gary Ablett Sr
 Darren Jarman
 Alex Jesaulenko
 Malcolm Blight
 Gary Buckenara
 Peter Daicos
 Wayne Johnston
 Michael Turner
 Roger Dean
 Graham Arthur
 Paul Hudson
 James Hird
 Jason Akermanis
 Nicky Winmar
 Phil Krakouer
 Mick Conlan
 Mark Mercuri
 Nathan Brown
 Brad Johnson
 Stevie Johnson
 Brent Harvey
 Cyril Rioli

Forward line
The forward line, similarly to the back line, can either refer to the full-forward line or both the full- and half-forward lines.

Full-forward 
Full-forwards are good at one-on-one contests with the opposition and are the main target in the forward line when attacking. This means they can produce mass numbers of goals in a season or match.  Contests in the goalsquare require the strength and weight to be able to jostle or wrestle opponents to front position and keep fullbacks at bay and not as much running is required as midfielders.  As a result, full-forwards are typically both tall and powerfully built.  A full-forward that is strongly built and specialises in charging packs is often categorised as a power forward.

As well as contesting marks with their strength, full forwards will try to run into space to shake off their defender and take an uncontested mark (this is known as "leading", "leading for the ball" or "leading into space"). This means that the full forward needs to be fast, but only in short bursts. In modern times, some teams have experimented by playing a smaller and faster player (possibly a former forward pocket or flanker) at full forward in order to beat the defender with speed rather than strength. In the case of Mark Williams (Hawthorn) and Brad Johnson (Western Bulldogs), this has been extremely successful.

Notable full-forwards:

 Peter Hudson
 John Coleman
 Gordon Coventry
 Jason Dunstall
 Tony Lockett
 Doug Wade
 Bob Pratt
 Jack Titus
 Jack Moriarty
 Bill Mohr
 Harry Vallence
 Dick Lee
 Ken Farmer
 George Doig
 Fred Fanning
 Peter McKenna
 Geoff Blethyn
  Alex Jesaulenko
 Michael Moncrieff
 Alastair Lynch
 Matthew Lloyd
 Tony Modra
 Saverio Rocca
 Brendan Fevola
 Lance Franklin
 Barry Hall
 Jack Riewoldt
 Josh J. Kennedy
 Tom Hawkins
 Jack Anthony

Forward pocket 
The forward pocket is designed as either a role for a second full forward (also known as a third key forward) or for players who are smaller but faster and more agile and capable of kicking brilliantly on the run (this is the more traditional forward pocket). Many forward pockets, like rovers, are quick thinking and opportunistic "crumbing" players.  This means that they need to be short enough to pick up the ball quickly after it hits the ground from a contest, think and move quickly to evade potential tackles, and kick or set up a goal.

Like some back pockets, some forward pockets are like medium-sized full forwards—tall and strong enough to contest marks, and mobile enough to crumb the ball. Some players in this mould, such as Russell Robertson, are capable of playing full forward outright.

Crumbing forward pockets do not exclusively crumb the ball. Sometimes, they lead for the ball like full forwards, so they have to be competent at marking the ball. Some forward pockets can even jump so high that they can contest marks, despite their lack of height.

Notable forward pocket players:

 Jeff Farmer
 Silvio Foschini
 Vin Catoggio
 Peter Daicos
 Norm Goss
 Brad Johnson
 Brad Hardie
 Leon Davis
 Angus Monfries
 Phillip Matera
 Eddie Betts
 Brett Ebert
 Stephen Milne
 Mark LeCras
 Hayden Ballantyne
 Michael Walters

Followers 

The followers are three different roles, the "ruck", "rover" and "ruck-rover".

Also known as the on-ball division, the followers consist of three players: a ruckman, a ruck-rover and a rover. They are known as followers because they have traditionally been used as players that follow the ball all around the ground as opposed to playing in a set position. With modern Australian rules football there is a decreased emphasis on set positions, but followers generally cover much more ground than other players on the field.

Ruckman—their role is to contest with the opposing ruckman at centre-bounces which take place at the start of each quarter or after each goal and also at stoppages (i.e., boundary throw ins, ball ups). Traditionally, ruckmen have simply been tall players with limited skill and speed, whose only job was to provide a contest in the ruck. In recent times, however, ruckmen have become faster and more skilled, so they can play as an extra midfielder in between ruck contests.

The tallest AFL players ever are ruckmen Mason Cox (Collingwood), Aaron Sandilands (Fremantle), Peter Street (Western Bulldogs) and Ned Reeves (Hawthorn), all of whom measure .

Notable Ruckmen:

 Syd Coventry
 Jack Dyer
 Roy Cazaly
 Vic Cumberland
 Percy Bentley
 Roy Wright
 Alan Gale
 Jack Clarke
 Denis Cordner
 Polly Farmer
 Sam Newman
 Carl Ditterich
 John Nicholls
 John Schultz
 Noel Teasdale
 Mike Pyke
 Len Thompson
 Gary Dempsey
 Don Scott
 Stephen Michael
 Rick Davies
 Graham Moss
 Peter Moore
 Barry Round
 Simon Madden
 Peter Carey
 Jim Stynes
 Shaun Rehn
 Greg Stafford
 Scott Wynd
 Jeff White
 Paul Salmon
 Brad Ottens
 Peter Everitt
 Dean Cox
 Aaron Sandilands
 Max Gawn

Ruck-rover—their role is to be directly beneath the flight of the ball when a ruckman taps the ball down, allowing an easy take away, or clearance, from a stoppage.

Rover—their role is to lurk around centre bounces and stoppages to receive the ball from a ruckman or ruck-rover and complete a clearance. Rovers are typically the smallest player on the ground. In modern football, the rover, ruck-rover, centreman and wingmen are often grouped together as midfielders.

The traditional ruck-rover and rover positions are an anachronism in today's game. Along with the centre line players, the ruck-rover and rover form the midfield.

Midfield 

The traditional centreline consists of the centre and the wingmen. These three players are usually good at winning the ball and running with it. They help turn defence into attack and set up attacking plays. As their main role is to deliver the ball to the forwards, they are sometimes called link men.

Physically, centre line players need to have good turning agility, above-average ability to read the play and, as they are involved in both attack and defence, a high level of stamina and teamwork. Furthermore, they must possess very good kicking or handball skills, preferably on both sides of the body.

The centreline and on-ballers form what is known as the midfield. Midfielders are generally separated into two categories: inside midfielders and outside midfielders. The inside midfielders' main responsibility is to win the ball from the stoppages and feed it out to the outside midfielders, who are generally the quicker, more elusive players.

Notable midfielders:

 Haydn Bunton
 Jack Worrall
 Allan La Fontaine
 Dick Reynolds
 Thorold Merrett
 Stan Heal
 Les Foote
 Bill Hutchison
 Bob Quinn
 Des Fothergill
 Allan Hopkins
 Allan Ruthven
 Allen Aylett
 Bob Hank
 Herbie Matthews
 Marcus Whelan
 Ron Barassi
 Jack Clarke
 Bob Skilton
 Bob Rose
 Ian Stewart
 Des Tuddenham
 John Murphy
 Barry Cable
 Kevin Bartlett
 Peter Bedford
 Leigh Matthews
 Garry Wilson
 Keith Greig
 Robert Flower
 Maurice Rioli
 Wayne Schimmelbusch
 Michael Tuck
 Gerard Healy
 Tim Watson
 Dale Weightman
 Jim Krakouer
 John Platten
 Craig Bradley
 Greg Williams
 Gavin Brown
 Garry Hocking
 Chris McDermott
 Tony McGuinness
 Peter Matera
 Paul Kelly
 Anthony Stevens
 Robert Harvey
 Michael Voss
 Mark Ricciuto
 Nathan Buckley
 Shane Crawford
 Scott West
 Simon Black
 Daniel Kerr
 Nigel Lappin
 Gary Ablett, Jr.
 Chris Judd
 Luke Hodge
 Sam Mitchell
 Jimmy Bartel
 Dane Swan
 Scott Pendlebury
 Jobe Watson
 Joel Selwood
 Patrick Dangerfield
 Ben Cousins
 Nathan Fyfe
 Dustin Martin
 Trent Cotchin
 Josh Kennedy

Taggers 
Taggers, also known as run-with players or stoppers, mark the opposition's best player (often a midfielder, although sometimes a half-back) and restrict their impact on the game. Good taggers must be fit, disciplined and focused. They must be strong enough to keep their position in stoppages and contested play (without conceding free kicks), yet fast enough to match their opponent's spread. Notable taggers include Ryan Crowley, Steven Baker, Brett Kirk, Cameron Ling, Kane Cornes, Ben Jacobs, Brady Rawlings, Shane Heard and Matt de Boer.

Interchange bench

Players named as the interchange, also often known as the "bench", are not permitted to enter the field of play unless substituting for a player during the game. Up to four players can be named on the bench; this number has steadily increased from a single player in the 1930s. Representative teams (such as State of Origin teams or honorific teams such as the AFL Team of the Century), practise and exhibition matches often feature an extended interchange bench of up to six or eight players.

Until the 1970s, the single interchange player, known as the "nineteenth man" or the "reserve" acted only as a substitution for an injured or out of form player; the player substituted out of the game could take no further part. Since the 1970s, interchange has increased from two to three to four players, and substitutions may be made as often as the coach wishes, with players allowed to be moved onto and off from the ground for several rests during the game.

The four players named on the interchange bench in the teamsheet (which is submitted ninety minutes before the commencement of the game) must actually start on the bench, however they may be substituted immediately if the coach wishes.

Substitute
From 2011 until 2015, the AFL level interchange rules provided that each team was permitted three interchange players (instead of four) and one substitute player.

The substitute sat on the bench and began the game wearing a green vest over his playing guernsey. He was not permitted to enter the field of play, nor be interchanged while wearing the green vest. At any time during the game, he could be substituted for one of the other players in the team—either on the ground or on the bench. He took off his green vest, and the player he substituted put on a red vest. The player in the red vest could take no further part in the game. Teams were limited to a single substitution per game. Players were substituted for tactical reasons or to replace an injured player.

At the start of the 2016 season the substitute rule was removed, returning to four available interchange players.

The substitute returned in the 2021 season, but was only available to replace an injured player.

Utility players
There are very few players in the AFL league who possess the skill and poise to be able to consistently perform to a very high standard in many different positions. Some of these players do not receive the recognition they deserve, while others, such as Matthew Pavlich, Jimmy Bartel, and Adam Goodes, are praised for their versatility and ability to influence a game from any position.

Traditionally, a utility player is an unheralded but nonetheless important player. He does not dominate one position, instead he is like a "spare parts" player because he can fill in at a variety of positions and do a good job in each.

Nowadays, the need for more versatility in players has resulted in many players "doubling up" their roles. Practically every midfielder can play Forward Pocket, Back Pocket, Half-Forward Flank or Half-Back Flank. Most, if not all, starting ruckmen can play as tall forwards, or in rarer cases, tall defenders. Some tall defenders can play as tall forwards and vice versa. This means that most AFL players have a specialist position and one or two "fill-in" positions.

One exception to this would be a player who is actually a specialist at two positions, not just a fill-in (i.e. Adam Hunter, the Eagles' best Centre-Half Back, is also one of their most dominant Full Forwards). Another exception would be midfielders, such as James Hird and Anthony Koutoufides, who have the height and strength to play key positions. This requires an extremely rare blend of skills and abilities.

Below are a number of players who are notable for their ability to dominate various positions.

Notable players:

 Adam Goodes: Centre Half-Back, Ruck Centre, Half-Forward
 Bernie Quinlan: Ruck-rover, Centre Half-Forward, Full-Forward
 Malcolm Blight: Ruck-rover, Wing, Half-Forward Flanker, Full-Forward
 Barrie Robran: Centre, Ruck-rover, Centre Half-Back, Centre Half-Forward, Full-Forward
 Alex Jesaulenko: Centre, Ruck-rover, Half-Back Flank, Half-Forward Flanker, Full-Forward
 Gary Ablett: Wing, Half-Forward Flanker, Half-Back Flank, Forward Pocket, Full-Forward
 Peter Knights: Centre Half-Back, Half-Back Flank, Centre Half-Forward, Half-Forward Flanker, Full-Forward
 Phil Carman: Centre, Ruck-rover, Centre Half-Forward, Half-Forward Flanker, Full-Forward
 Francis Bourke: Wing, Half-Back Flank, Full-Back, Full-Forward
 Brent Crosswell: Centre, Ruck-rover, Half-Forward Flanker, Centre Half-Forward, Centre Half-Back, Half-Back Flank
 Terry Daniher: Full-Forward, Centre Half-Forward, Half-Forward Flanker, Half-Back Flank, Centre Half-Back, Full Back
 Neale Daniher: Full-Forward, Centre Half-Forward, Half-Forward Flanker, Half-Back Flank, Centre Half-Back, Ruck-Rover
 Anthony Koutoufides: Wing, Centre, Ruck, Ruck-rover, Rover, Centre Half-Back, Centre Half-Forward, Full-forward.
 Matthew Pavlich: Centre Half-Forward, Centre, Full-Forward, Centre Half-Back, Fullback
 Luke Hodge: Centre, Ruck-Rover, Centre Half-Back, Half-Back Flank, Back Pocket, Wing, Half-Forward Flanker, Forward Pocket
 James Hird: Forward Pocket, Half-Forward Flank, Wing, Rover, Half-Back, Centre Half-Back, Centre Half-Forward
 Chad Cornes: Centre Half-Back, Half-Forward flank, Centre, Wing, Ruck-Rover, Back Pocket, Tagger
 Matthew Richardson: Centre Half-Forward, Full-Forward, Wing
 Brendon Goddard: Half-Back Flank, Centre Half-Forward, Wing, Half-Forward Flanker, Forward Pocket, Back Pocket, Full-Forward, Centre Half-Back, Centre
 Shane Edwards: Centre, Ruck-rover, Half-Forward, Half-Back
 Mark Blicavs: Half-Back Flank, Full Back, Centre Half-Back, Ruck, Centre, Tagger, Ruck-Rover, Back Pocket, Rover, Wing

Alternate position and grouping names

See also 
List of Australian Rules footballers
Flooding
Captain (Australian rules football)

References

Sources
 AFL "Guide to Season 2005" (2004) p. 493

Bibliography

Australian rules football terminology
Football positions